Caress Your Soul is the debut studio album by Australian rock band Sticky Fingers, Produced by Dann Hume released through Sureshaker in March 2013. Caress Your Soul debuted and peaked at number 39 on the ARIA Charts. The album was certified platinum in Australia in 2020.

Reception
Dave Couri from The Brag said "What is most impressive about Caress Your Soul is its obvious attention to arrangement, and in particular, the effort put in to the quality of vocal tracks really shines." Couri continued "It's difficult to describe exactly the signature sound of Sticky Fingers. You'd come close by blending one part psych-pop, with hints of rocksteady reggae, and just a sprinkling of British indie sensibility" and concluded saying "This is a debut record worthy of the attention".

Sebastian Skeet from the Music AU complemented the band's dance, reggae and dub grooves "which are the essence of their appeal" and said "Their debut album is incredibly well put together".

Track listing

Charts

Certifications

Release history

References

2013 debut albums
Sticky Fingers (band) albums